The blue-mantled crested flycatcher or African crested flycatcher (Trochocercus cyanomelas) is a species of bird in the family Monarchidae found in eastern and south-eastern Africa.

Its natural habitats are subtropical or tropical dry forests and subtropical or tropical moist lowland forests.

Taxonomy and systematics
The blue-mantled crested flycatcher was originally described in the genus Muscicapa and some authorities have also classified it in the genus Terpsiphone. Alternate names for the blue-mantled crested flycatcher include blue-mantled flycatcher, blue-mantled paradise-flycatcher, Cape crested-flycatcher and crested flycatcher.

Subspecies
Five subspecies are recognized:
 T. c. vivax - Neave, 1909: Found from Uganda and north-western Tanzania to south-eastern Democratic Republic of the Congo and northern and western Zambia
 East African crested flycatcher (T. c. bivittatus) - Reichenow, 1879: Originally described as a separate species. Found from Somalia to eastern Tanzania
 T. c. megalolophus - Swynnerton, 1907: Originally described as a separate species. Found from Malawi and northern Mozambique to Zimbabwe and eastern KwaZulu-Natal (north-eastern South Africa)
 T. c. segregus - Clancey, 1975: Found in eastern Northern Province and western KwaZulu-Natal (north-eastern South Africa)
 T. c. cyanomelas - (Vieillot, 1818): Found in south and south-eastern South Africa

Diet 
Like all members of the  monarch flycatcher family, the blue-mantled crested flycatcher is insectivorous.

References

External links
 Blue-mantled crested flycatcher - Species text in The Atlas of Southern African Birds.

blue-mantled crested flycatcher
Birds of Central Africa
Birds of East Africa
Birds of Southern Africa
blue-mantled crested flycatcher
Taxa named by Louis Jean Pierre Vieillot
Taxonomy articles created by Polbot